Jihad Khaled Ayoub (born 30 March 1995) is a professional footballer who plays as a defensive midfielder for Indonesian club PSS Sleman. Born in Venezuela to Lebanese parents, Ayoub plays for the Lebanon national team.

Club career

Early career 
Born in Venezuela, Ayoub played for various youth academies in Venezuela, Argentina and England, as well as the under-21 team of Maltese side Melita.

Ayoub joined Lebanese Premier League side Ahed in January 2017, helping them lift the league title in 2016–17. He was sent on a one-year loan to Lebanese Second Division side Shabab Sahel for the 2017–18 season, where they finished in first place and were promoted to the Premier League.

Bekaa 
He moved to Bekaa on a free transfer in summer 2018. On 24 February 2019, Ayoub assisted both of Bekaa's goals against Ansar in a 2–2 draw. He finished the season with two goals in 20 games, and was regarded as one of the club's best-performing players in the 2018–19 season.

Ansar 
Following a trial with the club, Ayoub joined Ansar on a two-year contract in May 2019. Having extended his contract in July 2020, Ayoub announced his decision to end his contract in March 2021. He returned to the club the same month, and helped Ansar win the domestic double (league and Lebanese FA Cup) in 2020–21. Ayoub renewed his contract in July 2021.

PSS Sleman 
On 6 July 2022, Ayoub joined Indonesian club PSS Sleman.

International career

Ayoub made his international debut for Lebanon on 1 December 2021, as a substitute in a 1–0 defeat to Egypt in the 2021 FIFA Arab Cup.

Career statistics

International

Honours
Ahed
 Lebanese Premier League: 2016–17

Ansar
 Lebanese Premier League: 2020–21
 Lebanese FA Cup: 2020–21; runner-up: 2021–22
 Lebanese Elite Cup: 2019
 Lebanese Super Cup: 2021

See also
 List of Lebanon international footballers born outside Lebanon

References

External links

 

1995 births
Living people
People from Nueva Esparta
Venezuelan people of Lebanese descent
Sportspeople of Lebanese descent
Venezuelan footballers
Lebanese footballers
Association football midfielders
Melita F.C. players
Al Ahed FC players
Shabab Al Sahel FC players
Bekaa SC players
Al Ansar FC players
PSS Sleman players
Lebanese Premier League players
Lebanese Second Division players
Liga 1 (Indonesia) players
Lebanon international footballers
Venezuelan expatriate footballers
Venezuelan expatriate sportspeople in Argentina
Venezuelan expatriate sportspeople in England
Venezuelan expatriate sportspeople in Malta
Venezuelan expatriate sportspeople in Indonesia
Lebanese expatriate footballers
Lebanese expatriate sportspeople in Argentina
Lebanese expatriate sportspeople in England
Lebanese expatriate sportspeople in Malta
Lebanese expatriate sportspeople in Indonesia
Expatriate footballers in Argentina
Expatriate footballers in England
Expatriate footballers in Malta
Expatriate footballers in Indonesia